Fugro is a Dutch multinational public company headquartered in Leidschendam, Netherlands.  It is primarily a services company focused on geotechnical, survey and geoscience services.  The company is listed on Euronext Amsterdam, Mark Heine is the CEO and Chairman of the Board of Management and Harrie L.J. Noy is Chairman of the Supervisory Board.

History
Kornelis "Kees" Joustra founded Fugro on 2 May 1962 as Ingenieursbureau voor Funderingstechniek en Grondmechanica, Dutch for "Engineering Company for Foundation technology and Soil Mechanics". In the wake of the 1970s energy crisis the offshore business came to a standstill. This resulted in the acquisition of its main competitor, McClelland, into Fugro-McClelland in October 1987.

In 1991, Fugro Chance formed in Lafayette, Louisiana as a subsidiary through the acquisition of a small surveying company led by John Chance.  By 2007, this subsidiary and two others—John Chance Land Surveys and Fugro GeoServices (formerly John Chance Marine Surveying)—employed 455 in the Lafayette area.

In April 1992, Fugro went public on the Amsterdam Stock Exchange. In 2003, Fugro bought Thales Geosolutions for €147.5 million, its largest acquisition to date. In September 2012, CGGVeritas acquired Fugro's Geoscience Division for €1.2 billion.

The first recipient of Fugro's Herman Zuidberg Award for Innovation was named in 2006, Dariusz Lapucha of Poland who moved to the United States and was working for the Fugro Chance subsidiary at the time of the award.  Lapucha garnered the award for his work on an enhanced GPS receiver with a practical resolution of a few inches which improved "the technical ability and profitability of the Fugro organization".  This same year, Fugro Chance was the first recipient of the Fugro Award of Excellence, bestowed by "the chief executive officer of Fugro to the member of the Fugro group of companies that makes the most outstanding contribution during the year"; specifically Fugro Chance was recognized for their response to hurricanes Ivan, Katrina and Rita.

Fugro purchased the Remote Observation Automated Modelling Economic Simulation (ROAMES) technology from Ergon Energy in 2014.

In January 2015, Royal Boskalis Westminster increased its shareholdings in Fugro to 20.1%.

In February 2023, Fugro purchased two platform supply vessels (PSVs) Topaz Endurance and Topaz Energy and aim to re-purpose the vessels to support subsea surveys in the offshore gas, oil and renewable industries.

In February 2023, Fugro opened a new operations center in St. John's, Canada for controlling offshore survey operations.

Activities 
In June 2014, the Australian Transport Safety Bureau (ATSB) awarded Fugro, through it's subsidiary Fugro Survey Pty. Ltd., the contract to conduct the search for Malaysia Airlines Flight 370, which disappeared on 8 March 2014. In August 2014 it awarded an additional contract for the deployment of two specialist vessels. The contract was worth AUD$39 million and lasted until August 2016. Fugro had around 200 employees and 3 search vessels dedicated to the search for MH370.  In 2015, in the midst of the search, the company received many criticisms related to their methods and equipment.

The Fugro Chance subsidiary, based in Louisiana, United States, provides services to the oil industry in the Gulf of Mexico including their making available without cost underwater maps, current and historical, of pipeline courses, useful in the context of post-hurricane damage assessment and property assessment prior to leasing of underwater property from the Bureau of Ocean Energy Management (BOEM).  Fugro Chance has also contracted with the United States Army Corps of Engineers to conduct airborne laser mapping toward creation and updating of nautical charts and maps.  Fugro Geoservices, another firm which arose from a 1991 merger in Louisiana and which is now based in Houston, Texas, provides boat-based underwater video, sonar, seismic and magnetic sensing to firms engaged in oil and gas exploration and the aforementioned BOEM US government agency.  Fugro provides similar services in Canada, with the inclusion of remotely operated unmanned devices which have advantages of minimizing risks to crew of manned vessels and reducing data latency and increasing analysis speed.

Rutherford County, Tennessee contracted with Fugro Earthdata in 2004 to conduct the county's first digital mapping project.  The county has retained this Fugro subsidiary's services for orthoimagery, topographic mapping and geographical information systems (GIS) through at least 2014.

By 2015, "about 20" state departments of transportation in the United States had purchased and deployed "video- and laser-equipped vans" used to survey street pavement conditions, so-called "spider vans" from Fugro; the firm is one of several that manufacture such systems.

See also

 List of oilfield service companies

Notes

References

Multinational companies headquartered in the Netherlands
Technology companies established in 1962
1962 establishments in the Netherlands
Leidschendam-Voorburg